Gary & Mike is an American adult animated buddy comedy sitcom that aired on UPN in 2001 and Comedy Central in 2003. It was Big Ticket Television’s first animated show. The show was produced in stop motion clay animation and lasted only one season.  A total of thirteen episodes were produced. The series was initially proposed to Fox, but was eventually passed over to UPN. UPN had aired the episodes out of order, leading to inconsistencies within the plot serialization (save for the production placement of the third and fourth episodes).

In addition to its own musical score by Greg O'Connor and title theme by Bottlefly, the series has had a number of licensed songs that can be heard throughout most of the episodes.

The Sizzle that was initially proposed to Fox was animated by Corky Quakenbush before the series was passed over to Will Vinton Studios. It featured the songs Girls by Beastie Boys and Heroes by The Wallflowers.

Plot summary
This mid-season replacement show was about two best friends traveling across the United States on a road trip, accomplishing nothing of importance, and unwittingly destroying hopes, dreams, and personal property. Gary is a fairly normal, albeit high-strung, uptight, good hearted loser while Mike is the fun-loving, laid back, "best friend from hell" with a sex addiction. They meet hookers, mole people, and a scheming murderer, all while a vengeful father pursues Mike for bedding his daughter.

Although the final episode included a "to be continued" message, the show was canceled after its first season. According to co-creator Adam Small, 10 more episodes were planned for the second season. The cancellation was actually a result of the financial issues UPN was facing at the time rather than a ratings issue.

Episode list

Awards
The show won two Emmy awards for Outstanding Individual Achievement in Animation. It was also nominated in the category for Outstanding Music & Lyrics. Gary and Mike was also nominated by the Casting Society of America for Best Casting for Animated Voiceover-Television.

References

External links

2000s American adult animated television series
2000s American sitcoms
2001 American television series debuts
2001 American television series endings
American adult animated comedy television series
American animated sitcoms
American stop-motion adult animated television series
Clay animation television series
English-language television shows
Television series by CBS Studios
UPN original programming